Radoslav Zhivkov (Bulgarian: Радослав Руменов Живков; born 27 March 1999) is a Bulgarian footballer who plays as a forward for CSKA Sofia.

Career
Zhivkov joined CSKA Sofia from the youth academy and debuted for the second team in 2016 where he made five appearances. He made his senior debut on 28 July 2018 for Litex Lovech, in a 2–3 league loss over Tsarsko Selo at Gradski stadion. After spending three seasons on loan, he debuted for CSKA Sofia in the 4–0 loss in the Bulgarian Supercup, replacing Jordy Caicedo in the 56th minute.

Career statistics

Club
As of 14 November 2022

References

External links
 

1999 births
Living people
Bulgarian footballers
Bulgaria youth international footballers
Association football forwards
PFC Litex Lovech players
PFC CSKA Sofia players
First Professional Football League (Bulgaria) players
Footballers from Sofia